"Coquette" is a 1928 fox trot jazz standard. It was composed by Johnny Green and Carmen Lombardo, with lyrics by Gus Kahn. Guy Lombardo had great success with the song in 1928.

Film appearance
 Cockeyed Cavaliers (1934)

Notable recordings 
 Guy Lombardo & his Royal Canadians (vocal Carmen Lombardo) recorded on March 21, 1928, and released on Columbia 1345-D.
 Paul Whiteman & his Orchestra (recorded on March 2, 1928, and released on Victor 21301.
 The Dorsey Brothers Orchestra recorded on March 14, 1928 and released on Okeh 41007
 Rudy Vallée & His Connecticut Yankees - recorded February 7, 1929 and released on Victor 21880.
 The Ink Spots - recorded August 17, 1939 and released on Decca 3077.
 Louis Armstrong - recorded April 17, 1942 and released on Decca 4327.
 Django Reinhardt with Stéphane Grappelli (1946)
 Frankie Laine (1947)
 Billy Eckstine recorded for MGM Records in 1953 and released on MGM 11439. This version briefly reached the Billboard charts at No. 26.
 The Hi-Lo's included in the Rosemary Clooney album Ring Around Rosie (1957)
 Johnnie Ray for his live album Johnnie Ray In Las Vegas (1957)
 Fats Domino 1958 (Imperial Records X 5553), as the B-side to [[Whole Lotta Lovin' (Fats Domino song)|Whole Lotta Lovin']], and on the 1961 What A Party! album (Imperial  Records LP 9164)
 Russell Garcia & his Orchestra (on his 1958 album The Johnny Evergreens), starring Ted Nash on alto, flute, piccolo, tenor.
 Dinah Washington for her album Dinah '62 (1962)
 Nat King Cole included in the album L-O-V-E (1965)
 Bing Crosby on the 1965 album Bing Crosby's Treasury - The Songs I Love''
 Paul McCartney included in the album Run Devil Run (1999)

See also
 List of jazz standards

References

1920s jazz standards
1928 songs
Songs written by Carmen Lombardo
Paul McCartney songs
Guy Lombardo songs
Fats Domino songs